Nuno Miguel Monteiro Rocha (born 25 March 1992) is a Cape Verdean former professional footballer who played as a midfielder.

Club career

Marítimo
Born in Praia, Rocha moved to Portugal with C.S. Marítimo for his last year as a junior. He spent the vast majority of his first three senior seasons with the reserves, competing with them in both the second and third divisions.

Rocha made his Primeira Liga debut with the first team on 7 October 2013, playing the full 90 minutes in a 1–0 away loss against Vitória de Guimarães. He scored his first goal in the competition the following 16 February, the game's only at home to Vitória de Setúbal.

Universitatea Craiova
In June 2014, Rocha signed with Romanian club CS Universitatea Craiova. His maiden appearance in Liga I took place on 25 July, as he came on as a second-half substitute in a 1–1 home draw with CS Pandurii Târgu Jiu.

In the 2015–16 season, Rocha scored a career-best nine goals to help his team to finish in eighth position. His teammates included compatriots Kay and Rambé, and he was released from contract on 11 April 2017.

Tosno
On 7 June 2017, Rocha joined Russian Premier League side FC Tosno on a three-year deal. He helped them win the domestic cup in his only season, scoring the decisive penalty kick in the semi-final shootout against FC Spartak Moscow and also being featured in the decisive match against FC Avangard Kursk at the Volgograd Arena.

International career
Rocha earned his first cap for Cape Verde on 6 September 2014, in a 3–1 away win over Niger for the 2015 Africa Cup of Nations qualifiers. Selected for the finals by manager Rui Águas, he took part in all three group-phase games, which ended in draw and subsequent elimination.

On 1 September 2017, Rocha scored twice to hand his team a 2–1 defeat of South Africa, their first ever win against their African counterparts.

Career statistics

Club

International goals
Scores and results list Cape Verde's goal tally first, score column indicates score after each Rocha goal.

Honours
Tosno
Russian Cup: 2017–18

References

External links

Portuguese League profile 

1992 births
Living people
Sportspeople from Praia
Cape Verdean footballers
Footballers from Santiago, Cape Verde
Association football midfielders
Primeira Liga players
Liga Portugal 2 players
Segunda Divisão players
C.S. Marítimo players
Liga I players
CS Universitatea Craiova players
Russian Premier League players
FC Tosno players
Cape Verde international footballers
2015 Africa Cup of Nations players
Cape Verdean expatriate footballers
Expatriate footballers in Portugal
Expatriate footballers in Romania
Expatriate footballers in Russia
Cape Verdean expatriate sportspeople in Portugal
Cape Verdean expatriate sportspeople in Romania
Cape Verdean expatriate sportspeople in Russia